The Ray is a still life painting by Jean Simeon Chardin, first exhibited at the  on 3 June 1728, and long held by the Louvre in Paris.

Exhibition
On 25 September 1728, Simeon Chardin exhibited the painting and The Buffet as his reception pieces to the Académie royale de peinture et de sculpture. Both works remained with the Academy until the French Revolution, when they were moved to the new Muséum Central des Arts, now the Louvre.

Analysis
Chardin depicts the bloody underside of a skate, gutted and hanging from a hook on the stone wall. The fish lies above a shelf on which there are various domestic items to the right on a white cloth: two metal pans, a ceramic jug, a bottle and a knife. Below the skate are two other fish, and further to the left are some opened oysters and a cat with an arched back and raised fur, as if frightened by the sight. The composition can be analysed as a series of pyramids, with the pointed skate in the centre, the jug and other inanimate objects to the right, and the cat and oysters to the left. The handle of the knife hanging off the ledge and the corner of the stone wall leading past the cat away from the viewer, adds depth to the scene.

Chardin was influenced by the Dutch still life paintings of the 17th century: the scene has been compared to Rembrandt's painting of the Slaughtered Ox. Although described by Diderot as "'disgusting", the peculiar but realistic composition was admired by other artists, including Matisse. Marcel Proust likened the image of the eponymous ray to the "nave of a polychromatic cathedral."

Symbolism
As is often the case in Chardin's still lifes, the subject is not essential but the support for pictorial research, an exercise in style on light, reflections and textures. Chardin practiced painting for painting's sake before his time, as a precursor to the research of the end of the 19th century.

References

External links
An Unforgettable Fish From Honest Chardin, article in The New York Observer

1728 paintings
Paintings by Jean-Baptiste-Siméon Chardin
Still life paintings
Cats in art
Fish in art
Paintings in the Louvre by French artists